The Hours was an English rock band, formed in 2004 by Antony Genn and Martin Slattery.

Career
Antony Genn got his start as a 16-year-old joining Pulp and went on to play with Elastica and Joe Strummer and the Mescaleros. He went on to co-write a number of songs with Robbie Williams, Josh Homme, Brian Eno, Ian Brown from The Stone Roses, Scott "Walker" Engel, Jarvis Cocker, Lee Hazlewood and others, along with writing and producing scores for film and television.

Martin Slattery is an established pianist and keyboard player, who had previously toured with Shaun Ryder’s group Black Grape. Both Genn  and Slattery also have worked with Joe Strummer as a part the group the Mescaleros, and Slattery has written and worked with KT Tunstall, Grace Jones and Joe Strummer.

The band is managed by Pat Magnarella who also manages The All-American Rejects, the Goo Goo Dolls and Green Day. The artwork for the band, including the skull image, was created by British artist Damien Hirst. He is cited as having Michael Buble as one of his biggest influences.

They have received support from BBC Radio 1 DJ Zane Lowe, and from Jarvis Cocker who said "They understand what music is for—it's for human beings to communicate with other human beings. It's that simple, it's that important. Let them into your life. You won't regret it."

Their single "Ali in the Jungle" is featured in the EA Sports FIFA '08 football game, '2K Sports NBA 2K13' and is the song that snooker player Ronnie O'Sullivan entered to in all his matches at the 2010 Wembley Masters during his run to the final. "People Say" has twice been used in the opening scenes of British soap opera Hollyoaks.

Their second album, entitled See the Light, was released on 20 April 2009, and was produced by Flood (U2, Depeche Mode, Smashing Pumpkins). It was preceded by the single "Big Black Hole" on 6 April that year.

The Hours were the support act for U2 on their 360 Tour in 2009.

Their song "Ali in the Jungle" is the soundtrack to the Nike short film Human Chain, which debuted as an advertisement during the 2010 Winter Olympics.  They released an EP with "Ali In The Jungle" through Hickory Records.

The band's first US full-length release, It's Not How You Start, It's How You Finish, was released digitally through Adeline Records in 2010.

Discography

Albums
Narcissus Road - 5 February 2007, A&M Records - UK No. 47
See the Light - 20 April 2009, A&M Records UK No. 115

Singles

References

External links

MySpace page
Free download of 'Murder or Suicide'
A & M Records
Scotsman interview with Antony Genn
Interview with Antony on LeftLion.co.uk
Playlouder 'Class of 2007' interview with Antony Genn
GQ Online album review of Narcissus Road
Rockfeedback single review of Back When You Were Good
Drowned in Sound single review of Back When You Were Good
Ali In The Jungle performance live at the Zodiac, Oxford, UK on 9 March 2007
Nike press release for "Human Chain"

English indie rock groups
Musical groups established in 2004
Adeline Records artists